Pascal Fages is a French former professional rugby league footballer who represented France at the 1995 World Cup.

Background
Pascal Fages is the father of the rugby league footballer; Théo Fages.

References

Living people
Baroudeurs de Pia XIII players
French rugby league players
France national rugby league team players
Rugby league centres
Rugby league five-eighths
Year of birth missing (living people)